The 2017–18 season was Hajer's second consecutive season in the Prince Mohammad bin Salman League following their relegation from the Professional League during the 2015–16 season. It was also their 67th year in existence.

First-team squad

Out on loan

Transfers

In

Out

Loans in

Loans out

Competitions

Pre-season friendlies

Prince Mohammad bin Salman League

League table

Results summary

Results by matchday

Matches
All times are local, AST (UTC+3).

King Cup

All times are local, AST (UTC+3).

Statistics

Appearances and Goals

Last updated on 18 April 2018.

|-
! colspan=14 style=background:#dcdcdc; text-align:center|Goalkeepers

|-
! colspan=14 style=background:#dcdcdc; text-align:center|Defenders

|-
! colspan=14 style=background:#dcdcdc; text-align:center|Midfielders

|-
! colspan=14 style=background:#dcdcdc; text-align:center|Forwards

|-
! colspan=14 style=background:#dcdcdc; text-align:center| Players sent out on loan this season

|-
|}

Goalscorers
Last updated on 18 April 2018.

Clean sheets
Last updated on 18 April 2018.

References

Hajer Club seasons
Hajer